Hellinsia logistes is a moth of the family Pterophoridae. It is found in southern China.

References

Moths described in 1935
logistes
Moths of Asia